Mok is a romanisation of several Chinese surnames, as well as a Dutch, Hungarian, and Korean surname.

Mok may also refer to:
 Mok language, a Palaungic language of China and Thailand
 Morori language (ISO 639-3: mok), a Trans-New Guinea language of Indonesian
 Mok River, a tributary of the Yom River, Thailand
 Mok-dong (Mok Ward), a ward of Yangcheon District, Seoul, South Korea
 Mong Kok station (MTR station code), Hong Kong

People
 Mok, Palatine of Hungary, Hungarian lord
 Heo Mok (1595–1682), Korean scholar-official of the Joseon Dynasty
 MOK (born 1976), stage name of Tarkan Karaalioglu, a German rapper of Turkish descent

Fictional characters
 Ookla the Mok, a character in Thundarr the Barbarian voiced by Henry Corden
 Mok, one of the title characters in Pok & Mok

Technology
 Machine Owner Key, a computer booting security feature of  Unified Extensible Firmware Interface (UEFI)